High Bluff, also spelled Highbluff, is an unincorporated community in Geneva County, Alabama, United States.

History
A post office operated under the name High Bluff from 1890 to 1906.

References

Unincorporated communities in Geneva County, Alabama
Unincorporated communities in Alabama